The 2020 United States Senate election in Nebraska was held on November 3, 2020, to elect a member of the United States Senate to represent the State of Nebraska, concurrently with the 2020 U.S. presidential election, as well as other elections to the United States Senate, elections to the United States House of Representatives and various state and local elections.

Incumbent Republican Senator Ben Sasse was challenged by Democratic nominee Chris Janicek, who was disavowed by his party after numerous scandals; by write-in candidate Preston Love Jr., who received the support of the state Democratic Party; and by Libertarian nominee Gene Siadek.

Sasse was reelected to a second term in office with 62.7% of the vote and a 38.3% margin. He outperformed President Donald Trump by almost 27,000 votes, or 8.9%, compared to the concurrent presidential election, the largest overperformance by any Republican Senate candidate in the country that year. In contrast, Janicek was the worst performing Democratic Senate candidate in the country compared to Joe Biden, underperforming him by 13.1%. This was attributed to a sexual misconduct scandal affecting Janicek and split-ticket voting in Omaha suburbs.

Republican primary

Candidates

Nominee
Ben Sasse, incumbent U.S. Senator

Eliminated in primary
Matt Innis, businessman and former chair of the Lancaster County Republican Party

Declined
Charles Herbster, farmer
Pete Ricketts, Governor of Nebraska

Endorsements

Polling

Results

Democratic primary

Candidates

Nominee
Chris Janicek, businessman and candidate for U.S. Senate in 2018

On June 16, 2020, Janicek lost the support of the Nebraska Democratic Party after allegations of sending sexually explicit text messages about a female campaign staff member and allegedly using racist slurs to insult a guest at a party 20 years ago surfaced. Nonetheless, Janicek refused to drop out of the race and his name remained on the ballot in the general election. In September the state Democratic party supported Preston Love Jr. via a write-in candidacy.

Eliminated in primary
Dennis Frank Maček
Larry Marvin, perennial candidate
Angie Philips, mental health advocate
Alisha Shelton, Behavioral Health Clinical Supervisor
Andy Stock, former candidate for Lancaster County Treasurer
Dan Wik, physician

Declined
Chris Beutler, former mayor of Lincoln

Results

Other candidates

Libertarian Party

Nominee
Gene Siadek, former chairman of the Libertarian Party of Nebraska

Withdrawn
 Eric Dilliard

Results

Democratic write-in

Declared
Preston Love Jr., first vice president of the Omaha NAACP chapter and second associate chairman of the Nebraska Democratic Party, endorsed by the party after the allegations against Janicek.

Withdrawn
Brad Ashford, former Democratic Congressman from NE-02

General election

Predictions

Polling

Results

Notes

References

External links
 
 
  (State affiliate of the U.S. League of Women Voters)
 

Official campaign websites
 Ben Sasse (R) for Senate
 Chris Janicek (D) for Senate
 Gene Siadek (L) for Senate 
 Preston Love Jr. (D) for Senate 

2020
Nebraska
United States Senate